Bofi (Ɓòfì, Boffi) is a Gbaya language spoken in Boda and Bimbo subprefectures in southwestern Central African Republic. Those speakers in Bimbo are mostly Bambenga pygmies. Although they no longer live in the forest, their area was forested in 1950.

References

Gbaya languages
African Pygmies
Languages of the Central African Republic